Charles Henry Hall may refer to:

Charles Henry Hall (priest) (1763–1827), English churchman and academic
Charles Hall (Australian politician) (1851–1922), member of the Tasmanian Parliament
Charles Hall (cricketer, born 1906) (1906–1976), English cricketer

See also
Charles Hall (disambiguation)
Charlie Hall (disambiguation)